Ramon Natera, who also went by the title General Ramon Natera, was a leader of the guerrilla resistance against the invasion of the Dominican Republic by the US Marines in 1917. He is considered the most important guerrilla fighter as "he assembled the largest force and used the most sophisticated political tactics." He was an ardent nationalist who had a very disciplined group of peasants who fought the USA's imperialism. The US invaded to protect the sugar cane fields and project power into the Caribbean. Known colloquially as gavilleros or campeneros, the guerrillas who opposed their invasion were labeled as bandits.

References

Dominican Republic military personnel
Year of birth missing
Place of birth missing
Year of death missing
20th-century military personnel
People of the Banana Wars